Lawrence Joseph (born 1948 in Detroit, Michigan) is an American poet, writer, essayist, critic, lawyer, and professor of law.

Early life and education
Lawrence Joseph was born in 1948 in Detroit, Michigan. Joseph's grandparents, Lebanese Maronite and Syrian Melkite Eastern Catholics, were among the first Arab Americans to emigrate to Detroit around 1910, where both Joseph's parents were born.

He attended the University of Detroit Jesuit High School, the University of Michigan (B.A, 1970), Magdalene College, Cambridge (B.A. 1972, M.A. 1976), and the University of Michigan Law School (J. D. 1975).

Career 
Joseph, perhaps best known as a poet, won the 1983 Agnes Lynch Starrett Poetry Prize from the Pitt Poetry Series for his first book, Shouting at No One. His second book of poems, Curriculum Vitae, was published by the University of Pittsburgh Press in 1988. His most recent books of poems, Before Our Eyes (1993); Codes, Precepts, Biases, and Taboos: Poems 1973–1993 (2005), Into It (2005); So Where Are We? (2017); and A Certain Clarity (2020) are published by Farrar, Straus and Giroux.

Joseph is also the author of Lawyerland, a book of prose, published by FSG in 1997. Lawyerland was optioned for a film by John Malkovich, Lianne Helfon and Russell Smith's Mr. Mudd Productions.  A symposium, "The Lawyerland Essays," appeared in the Columbia Law Review. His book The Game Changed : Essays and Other Prose, appeared in 2011 in the University of Michigan Press’s Poets on Poetry series.

Joseph's poems, essays and criticism have appeared in magazines and newspapers both in the United States and internationally. His essay on Motown music and Rhythm and Blues, "The Music Is," which originally appeared in Tin House, was included in Da Capo Best Music Writing 2003, chosen by Guest Editor Matt Groening. His work has been widely anthologized, and his poetry is included in The Oxford Book of American Poetry.

Joseph is also the Tinnelly Professor of Law at St. John's University School of Law in New York City. Joseph served as law clerk to Justice G. Mennen Williams of the Michigan Supreme Court. He then joined the faculty at the University of Detroit School of Law. In 1981, he moved to New York City, where he was associated with the firm of Shearman & Sterling. He joined the St. John's law faculty in 1987.

Writing as a lawyer, Joseph has published in areas of labor, employment, tort and compensation law, jurisprudence, law and literature, and legal theory. He has served as Consultant on Tort and Compensation Law for the Michigan State Senate's Commission on Courts, and as Consultant for the Governor of Michigan's Commission on Workers' Compensation, Occupational Disease and Employment and has received  a grant from the Employment Standards Division of the United States Department of Labor. He is former Chairperson of the Association of American Law Schools section on Law and Interpretation.

Joseph has read from his work at numerous universities and law schools throughout the country and internationally, including Stanford University, Columbia University, Harvard University, University of Michigan, New York University, University of Pennsylvania, Georgetown University, and Northwestern University. Among his awards are also a fellowship from the John Simon Guggenheim Memorial Foundation and  two National Endowment for the Arts fellowships. In 2006 he was named the third recipient of the New York County Lawyers Association's "Law and Literature Award" (prior recipients are Louis Auchincloss and Louis Begley). As an undergraduate at Michigan, he received a major Hopwood Award in poetry.

He has been a member of the board of directors of Poets House, Poetry Society of America, and The Writer's Voice, and served on the International PEN Events Committee. In 1989, he lectured on law and on poetry in Jordan, Palestine, and Egypt through the cultural affairs offices of the United States embassies in each country. In 1994, he taught in the Council of the Humanities and Creative Writing Program at Princeton University.

His literary, professional, and personal papers have been acquired by the University of Michigan’s Special Collections Library and are housed at the Hatcher Graduate Library.

Joseph is a member of Phi Beta Kappa and the American Bar Association. He is married to the painter Nancy Van Goethem and lives in New York City.

Works
 Shouting at No One, poetry, (Pittsburgh: University of Pittsburgh Press, 1983)
 Curriculum Vitae, poetry, (Pittsburgh: University of Pittsburgh Press, 1988)
 Before Our Eyes, poetry, (New York: Farrar, Straus and Giroux, 1993)
 Lawyerland, prose,  (New York: Farrar, Straus and Giroux, 1997)
 Codes, Precepts, Biases, and Taboos: Poems 1973–1993, poetry, (New York: Farrar, Straus and Giroux, 2005)
 Into It, poetry, (New York: Farrar, Straus and Giroux, 2005)
 The Game Changed: Essays and Other Prose, criticism, (Ann Arbor, MI: University of Michigan Press, 2011)
 So Where Are We? Poems, poetry, (New York: Farrar, Straus and Giroux, 2017)
 A Certain Clarity: Selected Poems, poetry (Farrar Straus and Giroux, 2020)

References

Sources 

 Contemporary Authors Online. The Gale Group, 2004. PEN (Permanent Entry Number):  0000126684.
 Moghabghab, Emma, and Sirène Harb. "Lawrence Joseph's Into It: A Political Study of Power and Community." Studies in the Humanities 37.1&2 (2010): 3–21.

External links

 New York Times Book Review 2005 essay on Codes, Precepts, Biases, and Taboos and Into It
 Love Conquers Evil: Poetry Is About the Timetable by Chris Hedges
 Academy of American Poets: Lawrence Joseph biography
 Poetry Foundation: Lawrence Joseph
 St. John's University: Professor Joseph profile
 Jacket 2 Feature Poet with a Steady Job: An Introduction to Lawrence Joseph, 2012, edited by Eric Selinger with essays by Thomas DePietro, Norman Finkelstein, Lawrence Joseph, John Lowney, Frank D. Rashid, Eric Selinger, Lisa Steinman, Lee Upton, and Tyrone Williams
 Commonweal, Portrait of Our Time: An Interview with Lawrence Joseph by Anthony Domestico 2017  
 Living in the Towers' Shadow, by David Skeel, review of So Where Are We, Wall Street Journal, September 10, 2017 
 Kenyon Review 2017 Interview with Lawrence Joseph
 Where Are We? One of the Most Brilliant and Intense People I've Ever Known Has Some Answers, by Marianne Szegedy-Maszak, Mother Jones, November 25, 2017
 The Best Poetry of 2017, by David Orr, New York Times Book Review, December 22, 2017
 Lawrence Joseph in conversation with Paul Elie at Georgetown University, Feb. 1, 2018
 The Way I Feel the World: An Interview with Lawrence Joseph by Philip Metres, Michigan Quarterly Review, May 28, 2018
 Lawrence Joseph, A Certain Clarity: Selected Poems, MacMillan Author’s Page
 Thinking About Empire and Economy, With a Lawyer’s Mind and a Poet’s Words by Paul Franz, review of A Certain Clarity: Selected Poems, The New York Times Book Review, March 17, 2020

1948 births
Living people
American poets
American essayists
American lawyers
American legal scholars
Agnes Lynch Starrett Poetry Prize winners
Poets from New York (state)
Writers from Detroit
Writers from Manhattan
University of Detroit Jesuit High School and Academy alumni
Alumni of Magdalene College, Cambridge
University of Michigan Law School alumni
American Eastern Catholics
American writers of Syrian descent
American writers of Lebanese descent
American male poets
American male essayists